Genesis: The Journal of Genetics and Development (often styled genesis) is a peer-reviewed scientific journal of genetics and developmental biology. It was established as Developmental Genetics in 1979 and obtained its current title in 2000. In addition to original research articles, the journal also publishes letters to the editor and technology reports relevant to the understanding of the functions of genes. The editor-in-chief is Sally A. Moody (George Washington University).

Abstracting and indexing
The journal is abstracted and indexed in:

According to the Journal Citation Reports, the journal has a 2020 impact factor of 2.487, ranking it 22nd out of 41 journals in the category "Developmental Biology" and 118th out of 176 journals in the category "Genetics & Heredity".

References

External links 
 

Publications established in 1979
Genetics journals
Wiley-Liss academic journals
English-language journals
Monthly journals
Developmental biology journals